The Oriental Desert Express is a privately chartered tourist train offered between Oujda and Bouarfa, Morocco. It runs along a little-used railway line, and was featured in the 2015 film Spectre.

History 
The  line used by the Oriental Desert Express was originally built in the 1920s and 1930s as part of the Mediterranean–Niger Railway, but is now only used twice a week by trains carrying zinc, lead, and copper from local mines. Edi Kunz, a Swiss citizen living in Morocco, learned of the line and worked with Moroccan authorities for three years to start a tourist train along it, overcoming questions from the Moroccan government over the use of a historical "prince's wagon" passenger car and from the Swiss embassy in Morocco over the train's viability. Kunz ended up committing five million euros to the project. The first trip was made in 2006, and the train ran twice annually in years like 2013 and 2017.

Outside camera shots of the Oriental Desert Express were featured in the 2015 James Bond film Spectre.

Journey 
, the total travel time of the Oriental Desert Express can take between eight or twelve hours. The express begins in Oujda in the early morning with an EMD GT26CW-2 locomotive, known locally as a DH-370, and a consist of cars that include both air conditioning and open windows. Traversing the Hautes Plaines, the train makes a stop at the small town of Tendrara, Tagmoḍant. One such meeting was related by Neue Zürcher Zeitung:
... again the train stops. There are sheep outside and tents. We have arrived at nomads. The family leader invites us to tea in his tent. The women look at us curiously. But soon a conversation begins with hands and much laughter. The family belongs to the tribe of the Arabic-speaking Beni Guil, who have lived as nomads for over a thousand years.

References

External links 
Official website
YouTube video
Radio interview with Edi Kunz (in German)
Sand, stars on board Morocco's Oriental Desert Express
D’Oujda à Bouarfa à bord de l’Oriental Desert Express
Morocco tourists make tracks on 007's 'desert express'
Bond's 'Desert Express' for Morocco tourists
D'Oujda à Bouarfa à bord de l'Oriental Desert Express

Rail transport in Morocco